A leasing commission, or LC for short, is a fee paid by a commercial real estate landlord to a real estate broker in exchange for introducing a tenant that successfully completes a lease with the landlord. It is normally paid in the form of a percentage of the tenant's yearly rent. LCs are often lumped with tenant inducements as part of an overall cost-of-business line item in the accounts. For this reason, it is common to see references to "TI's and LC's".

References
 

Commercial real estate